Aldo Finzi (Milan, 4 February 1897 – 7 February 1945) was an Italian classical music composer.

External links
 https://maestroaldofinzi.com/en_US/
 http://www.aldo-finzi.com

1897 births
1945 deaths
Italian classical composers
Italian male classical composers
20th-century Italian Jews
Musicians from Milan
Jewish classical composers
20th-century classical composers
20th-century Italian composers
20th-century Italian male musicians